The Revenge is the second album by Allen/Lande, hard rock supergroup Allen-Lande, a collaboration between vocalists Russell Allen and Jørn Lande, released on 2007. A follow-up to their first album The Battle, it features a more progressive power metal-oriented sound.

Track listing

Personnel 
Musicians
Russell Allen - lead and backing vocals
Jørn Lande - lead and backing vocals
Magnus Karlsson - guitars, bass guitar, keyboards
Jaime Salazar - drums

Production
Magnus Karlsson, Serafino Perugino - production
Dennis Ward - mixing
Rodney Matthews - cover art

References 

2007 albums
Allen-Lande albums
Frontiers Records albums
Albums with cover art by Rodney Matthews
Vocal duet albums